Barbury Castle is a scheduled hillfort in Wiltshire, England. It is one of several such forts found along the ancient Ridgeway route. The site, which lies within the Wessex Downs Area of Outstanding Natural Beauty, has been managed as a country park by Swindon Borough Council since 1971. It is situated on Barbury Hill, a local vantage point, which, under ideal weather conditions, commands a view across to the Cotswolds and the River Severn. It has two deep defensive ditches and ramparts. The Old Ridgeway runs close by and the modern Ridgeway crosses through the castle. In the surrounding area are to be found round barrows, Celtic field systems and 18th-19th century flint workings.

History
The site was first occupied some 2,500 years ago, and was then in use during the Roman occupation of the area.  Archaeological investigations at Barbury have shown evidence of a number of buildings, indicating a village or military garrison at this time.

In the 6th century the site became part of the Saxon kingdom of Wessex, following the defeat of the Romano-British at the Battle of Beranburgh, Beran Byrig or Beranbyrig in AD 556, the site of which is just north of the castle. Centuries later the area was a favourite haunt of the 19th-century writer Richard Jefferies, who lived an hour's walk away at Coate. The site was designated as a scheduled monument in 1882.

In World War II the War Ministry appropriated the site for US Army Air Force anti-aircraft guns; the bases for these are apparently visible as hollows around the edge of the fort interior.

In 1996, a geophysical survey revealed traces of 40 hut circles inside the castle. A reconstruction of an Iron Age roundhouse was built on the site in 2006 but was destroyed by vandals in October 2008.

In 2009, English Heritage (now Historic England) carried out a National Mapping Programme project which comprised an interpretation, transcription and analysis of all archaeological features visible on aerial photographs in the environs of Barbury Castle.

Location 
Other than a couple of nearby farms, there is no current settlement near the site.

By road the site can only be approached by a single road ascending the scarp slope of the downs from midway along the B4005 between Wroughton and Chiseldon. More options are available by foot or horseback, including the Ridgeway, which runs east–west along the edge of the downs, and a byway south across the downs to Marlborough.

Gallery

See also 
List of hillforts in England
List of hillforts in Scotland
List of hillforts in Wales

References

External links 

Swindon Borough Council web page on Barbury Castle, archived in 2013

Archaeological sites in Wiltshire
Country parks in Wiltshire
Former populated places in Wiltshire
Hill forts in Wiltshire
Iron Age sites in England
Scheduled monuments in Wiltshire